The United States Postmaster General (PMG) is the chief executive officer of the United States Postal Service (USPS). The PMG is responsible for managing and directing the day-to-day operations of the agency.

The PMG is selected and appointed by the Board of Governors of the Postal Service, the members of which are appointed by the president of the United States, with the advice and consent of the United States Senate. The postmaster general then also sits on the board. The PMG does not serve at the president's pleasure and can be dismissed by the Board of Governors. The appointment of the postmaster general does not require Senate confirmation. The governors, and the postmaster general elect the deputy postmaster general.

The current officeholder is Louis DeJoy, appointed on June 16, 2020.

History 

The office, in one form or another, dates from before the United States Constitution and the United States Declaration of Independence, having been based on the much older English and later British position of Postmaster General.  Benjamin Franklin was appointed by the Continental Congress as the first postmaster general in 1775 serving just over 15 months. Franklin had previously served as deputy postmaster for the British colonies of North America since 1753.

Until 1971, the postmaster general was the head of the Post Office Department (or simply "Post Office" until the 1820s). During that era, the postmaster general was appointed by the president of the United States, with the advice and consent of the United States Senate. From 1829 to 1971, the postmaster general was a member of the president's Cabinet. After the passage of the Pendleton Civil Service Reform Act in 1883 and prior to the passage of the Hatch Act of 1939, the postmaster general was in charge of the governing party's patronage and was a powerful position which held much influence within the party, as exemplified by James Farley's 1933–1940 tenure under Franklin D. Roosevelt.

After the spoils system was reformed, the position remained a Cabinet post, and it was often given to a new president's campaign manager or other key political supporters, including Arthur Summerfield, W. Marvin Watson, and Larry O'Brien (all of whom played vital roles organizing the campaigns of presidents Eisenhower, Kennedy, and Johnson, respectively), and was considered something of a sinecure. Notably, poet and literary scholar Charles Olson (who served as a Democratic National Committee official during the 1944 United States presidential election) declined the position in January 1945.

In 1971, the Post Office Department was re-organized into the United States Postal Service, an independent agency of the executive branch, and the postmaster general was no longer a member of the Cabinet nor in line of presidential succession. The postmaster general is now appointed by the Board of Governors of the United States Postal Service, appointed by the president with the advice and consent of the Senate.

List of postmasters general

Under the Continental Congress

U.S. Post Office Department, 1789–1971

As non-Cabinet department, 1789–1829
 Parties

As cabinet department, 1829–1971
 Parties

U.S. Postal Service, 1971–present

See also
 Postmaster General
 John Henninger Reagan, the only postmaster general of the Confederate States of America

References

External links 

Postmaster General
Postmaster General
 
1775 establishments in the Thirteen Colonies